Richard de Carpentier (born 30 April 1990) is a backrow forward playing for the Worcester Warriors club in his second professional contract. His first professional contract was at Leicester Tigers  He is a sports coaching graduate of UWIC. He is also an England Sevens player, having made his debut in the Edinburgh leg of the 2011 World Series and former England Students captain.  De Carpentier is a product of Kirkham Grammar School in Lancashire, having played throughout the age groups with fellow Tiger and former schoolmate Kieran Brookes.

He signed a contract with Bath Rugby on 21st September 2021, ahead of the 2021/22 season due to a successful trial period.

References

https://www.quins.co.uk/news/richard-de-carpentier-signs-short-term-deal-with-harlequins/

External links
 

1990 births
Living people
English rugby union players
Worcester Warriors players
Rugby union flankers
Leicester Tigers players
Commonwealth Games medallists in rugby sevens
Commonwealth Games bronze medallists for England
Rugby sevens players at the 2018 Commonwealth Games
Rugby union players from Manchester
Medallists at the 2018 Commonwealth Games